The NASA X-57 Maxwell is an experimental aircraft being developed by NASA, intended to demonstrate technology to reduce fuel use, emissions, and noise. The first flight of the X-57 is scheduled to take place in 2023.

Development
The experiment involves replacing the wings on a twin-engined Italian-built Tecnam P2006T (a conventional four-seater light aircraft) with distributed electric propulsion (DEP) wings each containing electrically driven propellers. Test flights were initially planned to commence in 2017. 

The first test phase uses an 18-engine truck-mounted wing. The second phase will install the cruise propellers and motors on a standard P2006T for ground- and flight-test experience. Phase 3 tests will involve the high-lift DEP wing and demonstrate increased high-speed cruise efficiency.  The leading-edge nacelles will be fitted, but the high-lift propellers, motors and controllers will not be installed. Phase 4 adds the DEP motors and folding propellers to demonstrate lift-augmentation.

LEAPTech project 
The Leading Edge Asynchronous Propeller Technology (LEAPTech) project is a NASA project developing an experimental electric aircraft technology involving many small electric motors driving individual small propellers distributed along the edge of each aircraft wing.  To optimize performance, each motor can be operated independently at different speeds, decreasing reliance on fossil fuels, improving aircraft performance and ride quality, and reducing aircraft noise.

The LEAPTech project began in 2014 when researchers from NASA Langley Research Center and NASA Armstrong Flight Research Center  partnered with two California companies, Empirical Systems Aerospace (ESAero) in Pismo Beach and Joby Aviation in Santa Cruz, California. ESAero is the prime contractor responsible for system integration and instrumentation, while Joby is responsible for design and manufacture of the electric motors, propellers, and carbon fiber wing section.

In 2015, NASA researchers were ground testing a  span, carbon composite wing section with 18 electric motors powered by lithium iron phosphate batteries.
Preliminary testing up to  took place in January at Oceano County Airport on California's Central Coast.

The experiment precedes the X-57 Maxwell X-plane demonstrator proposed under NASA's Transformative Aeronautics Concepts program. A piloted X-plane should fly within a couple of years, after replacing a Tecnam P2006T wings and engines  with an improved version of the LEAPTech wing and motors. Using an existing airframe will allow engineers to easily compare the performance of the X-plane with the original P2006T.

X-57 Maxwell 

The X-57 project was publicly revealed by NASA Administrator Charles Bolden on 17 June 2016 in a keynote speech to the American Institute of Aeronautics and Astronautics (AIAA) at its Aviation 2016 exposition. The plane was named for Scottish physicist James Clerk Maxwell.

NASA's first X-plane in over a decade, it is part of NASA's New Aviation Horizons initiative, which will also produce up to five larger-scale aircraft. The X-57 was built by the agency's  project, over a four-year development period at Armstrong Flight Research Center, California, with a first flight initially planned for 2017.

In July 2017, Scaled Composites was modifying a first P2006T to the X-57 Mod II configuration by replacing the piston engines with Joby Aviation electric motors, to fly early in 2018.
Mod III configuration will move the motors to the wingtips to increase propulsive efficiency.
Mod IV configuration will see the installation of the Xperimental, LLC high aspect ratio wing with 12 smaller propellers along its leading edge to augment its takeoff and landing aerodynamic lift.

The donor Tecnam P2006T was received in California in July 2016.
In a December 2016 test, a battery cell was shorted and the overheating  spread to other cells, requiring the packaging to be redesigned from eight to sixteen modules with aluminum honeycomb separators.
The Rotax 912s will be replaced by  electric motors for the Mod II.
The Mod IV with 12 propellers to take off and land at the same speeds as the P2006T is yet unfunded.

In December 2017, the redesigned passively cooled battery module with 320 lithium-ion cell down from 640 passed testing.
The experience helped Electric Power Systems develop a battery for the Bye Aerospace Sun Flyer 2 which made its first flight in April 2018.
Joby Aviation delivered three cruise motors in 2017, and was assembling the final pair in June 2018.
Motor acceptance testing involving an 80-hour endurance test was to be simplified before vehicle integration.
Contractor ES Aero will lead extensive ground-tests over months, culminating in a mission-like 30 minutes at full power test, before flying within 2019.

By September 2018, the first Joby Aviation JM-X57 electric cruise motor were mounted with controllers, batteries and new cockpit displays at Scaled Composites in Mojave, before flight tests in mid-2019.
Construction of the ESAero high aspect ratio, low drag composite wing was then almost finished, to fly the Mod 3 by mid-2020.

Built by Xperimental, the cruise-optimized wing load testing was completed by September 2019, to ±120% of design load limit, verifying free movement of control surfaces and vibration testing for flutter predictions.
After motor ground runs, ESAero was to deliver the Mod 2 X-plane with electric motors replacing the original piston engines to NASA Armstrong Flight Research Center in California on the first week of October.
ESAero delivered it on October 2, 2019.
At that time, systems ground tests were to start by the end of 2019, and flight tests were to begin in the third quarter of 2020.

By February 2021, NASA was to start Mod 2 high-voltage functional ground testing at the Armstrong Flight Research Center in Edwards, California, toward taxi tests and first flight.

Design 

Modified from a Tecnam P2006T, the X-57 will be an electric aircraft, with 14 electric motors driving propellers mounted on the wing leading edges.
All 14 electric motors will be used during takeoff and landing, with only the outer two used during cruise.
The additional airflow over the wings created by the additional motors generates greater lift, allowing for a narrower wing.
The aircraft seats two.
A threefold reduction should come from the switch from piston engines to battery-electric.

Distributed propulsion increases the number and decreases the size of airplane engines. Electric motors are substantially smaller and lighter than jet engines of equivalent power. This allows them to be placed in different, more favorable locations. In this case, the engines are to be mounted above and distributed along the wings rather than suspended below them.

The propellers are mounted above the wing. They will increase the air flow over the wing at lower speeds, increasing its lift. The increased lift allows it to operate on shorter runways. Such a wing could be only a third of the width of the wing it replaces, saving weight and fuel costs. Typical light aircraft wings are relatively large to prevent the craft from stalling (which happens at low airspeeds, when the wing cannot provide sufficient lift). Large wings are inefficient at cruising speed because they create excess drag.

The speed of each propeller can be controlled independently, offering the ability to change the over-wing airflow pattern to cope with flying conditions, such as wind gusts. When cruising, the propellers closer to the fuselage could be folded back to further reduce drag, leaving those towards the wing tips to move the plane.
Such aircraft would have no in-flight emissions, operate with less noise and reduce operating costs by an estimated 30%.
Cruising efficiency was expected to increase 3.5 to 5-fold.

The five-blade propellers fold in cruise to reduce drag. The wingtip location offers favorable interaction with the wingtip vortices, expected to provide a 5% drag saving.
The  battery packs weight  for a  Wh/kg density.

The high-lift array of 12 propellers should maintain the  stall speed.
The optimized wing has 40% of the baseline area, reducing friction drag, and a wing loading 2.6 times higher.

Specifications (Mod IV)

See also 
 List of electric aircraft
 Aeronautics Research Mission Directorate
 NASA GL-10 Greased Lightning — hybrid diesel-electric tilt-wing UAV
 Eviation Alice — electric 9-passenger commuter aircraft under development
 Heart ES-30 — hybrid-electric 30-passenger regional airliner under development

References

External links 
 The Future of Aircraft Propulsion is Electric

2010s United States experimental aircraft
NASA aircraft
Green vehicles
Aviation and the environment
Research and development in the United States
Electric aircraft
Proposed aircraft of the United States